East Gongchen Bridge is a metro station on Line 5 of the Hangzhou Metro in China. It is located in the Gongshu District of Hangzhou.

Surrounding area
Gongchen Bridge

References

Railway stations in Zhejiang
Railway stations in China opened in 2019
Hangzhou Metro stations